Weapons Locker is a role-playing game supplement published by TSR in 1985 for the Marvel Super Heroes role-playing game.

Contents
Weapons Locker is a supplement describing numerous weapons and equipment items of the Marvel superheroes. It focuses on battlesuits, including the armor of Iron Man, Box, the Guardian, Stiltman, and Titanium Man. It also includes the weapons of S.H.I.E.L.D.

Publication history
MHAC8 Weapons Locker was written by Jerry Epperson and Jeff Grubb, with a cover by Mark Bright, and was published by TSR, Inc., in 1985 as a 32-page book.

Reception

Reviews

References

Marvel Comics role-playing game supplements
Role-playing game supplements introduced in 1985